Koblenz Charterhouse was a Carthusian monastery, or  charterhouse, in Koblenz, Rhineland-Palatinate, Germany. It stood on the Beatusberg, a hill that forms the north-easterly tip of the Hunsrück overlooking the city. The site was first occupied by a Benedictine monastery, the Kloster St. Beatusberg, which was closed in 1315, when the monks were replaced by a community of Augustinian Canons until the Carthusians took over the site in 1331.

The charterhouse was damaged in the Thirty Years' War and still more in the Siege of Koblenz in 1688 during the Nine Years' War, and was largely rebuilt in the 1720s and 1730s. It was dissolved in the secularisation under Napoleon in 1802, the monks having been expelled from the premises in 1794. The buildings were put to military use and then demolished for the construction of the Prussian Fort Grossfürst Konstantin in 1822–32.

The former charterhouse -  - has given its name to the modern district of Karthause, which contains not only the fort but also a prison, a secondary school and the state archives.

References

Further reading
 Energieversorgung Mittelrhein GmbH (publ.): Geschichte der Stadt Koblenz. Editors: Ingrid Bátori with Dieter Kerber and Hans Josef Schmidt
Band 1: Von den Anfängen bis zum Ende der kurfürstlichen Zeit. Theiss, Stuttgart 1992, 
Band 2: Von der französischen Stadt bis zur Gegenwart. Theiss, Stuttgart 1993, 
 Dieter Marcos (ed.): Andacht & Krieg. Festschrift zum 10-jährigen Jubiläum Pro Konstantin e.V., Imprimatur Verlag, Lahnstein 2004, 
 Fritz Michel: Die Kunstdenkmäler der Rheinprovinz. Die kirchlichen Denkmäler der Stadt Koblenz. (= Die Kunstdenkmäler der Rheinprovinz. Zwanzigster Band. 1. Abteilung). Schwann, Düsseldorf 1937, pp. 319–322
 Fritz Michel: Die Kunstdenkmäler der Stadt Koblenz. Die profanen Denkmäler und die Vororte. (= Die Kunstdenkmäler von Rheinland-Pfalz. Erster Band). München/ Berlin 1954
 Wolfgang Schütz: Koblenzer Köpfe. Personen der Stadtgeschichte – Namensgeber für Straßen und Plätze. 2nd revised and expanded edition. Verlag für Anzeigenblätter, Mülheim-Kärlich 2005, OCLC 712343799, pp. 279f.
 Hermann Josef Roth: "Koblenz", in: Monasticon Cartusiense, ed. Gerhard Schlegel, James Hogg, vol. 2, Salzburg 2004, pp. 563–570
 Ulrike Weber (ed.): Kulturdenkmäler in Rheinland-Pfalz. Denkmaltopographie Bundesrepublik Deutschland. Band 3.3: Stadt Koblenz. Stadtteile. Werner, Worms 2013, 

History of Koblenz
Buildings and structures in Koblenz
Carthusian monasteries in Germany
Monasteries in Rhineland-Palatinate